Laura Natalie Siegemund (born 4 March 1988) is a German professional tennis player.

She is a two-time Grand Slam champion, having won the 2020 US Open in women's doubles with Vera Zvonareva, as well as the 2016 US Open in mixed doubles alongside Mate Pavić. Siegemund reached her career-high doubles ranking of world No. 22 in March 2023, and has won ten doubles titles on the WTA Tour, including the 2022 Miami Open.

In singles, her career-high ranking is world No. 27, achieved in August 2016, and she has won two WTA titles, at the 2016 Swedish Open and 2017 Stuttgart Open. Siegemund's best Grand Slam result in singles was a quarterfinal appearance at the 2020 French Open. She also reached the same stage at the 2016 Summer Olympics, and has represented Germany in the Billie Jean King Cup since 2017.

Biography
Siegemund was born to parents Harro (an engineer) and Brigitta Siegemund, and has two siblings. She was introduced to tennis by her family at age three. Siegemund lived in Riyadh, Saudi Arabia from age four to seven and in Jakarta, Indonesia from nine to ten. Besides German, she is fluent in English and French, and in 2016, she completed her bachelor's degree in Psychology from the University of Hagen. Her tennis idol growing up was Steffi Graf.

Career

2000: Junior years
Siegemund won the Junior Orange Bowl in the "12 and under" age category as the first German since Steffi Graf in 1981.

2002–14: Contesting mainly on ITF Circuit
In 2002, Siegemund played her first events on the ITF Circuit. The following year, she contested her first WTA qualifying in Leipzig, Germany.

In 2004, she continued playing on ITF tournaments, and won her first ITF doubles title in 2005 in Darmstadt, Germany, and her first ITF singles title in 2006 in Lagos, Nigeria; and in that year also three other ITF doubles titles, but fell in WTA singles qualifying twice.

In 2007, she won one ITF doubles title, but fell in WTA singles qualifying once. She won three ITF doubles titles in 2008 and  two ITF doubles titles in 2009, but fell in WTA singles qualifying at the US Open.

In 2010, she played her first WTA Tour main draw at the Swedish Open, falling in the first round as a qualifier. She also won four doubles titles on the ITF Circuit, but fell in WTA tournament singles qualifying once.

She won one ITF singles title in 2011, but fell in WTA singles qualifying nine times (incl. Roland Garros, Wimbledon, US Open). In 2012, she won three singles titles and one doubles title on the ITF Circuit.

In 2013, she won three singles titles and two doubles titles on ITF Circuit, but fell in WTA singles qualifying once (again US Open).

In 2014, she won her first main-draw match on the WTA Tour at the Swedish Open in Båstad, defeating Yaroslava Shvedova in the first round. She won two singles titles and two doubles titles on ITF Circuit, but fell in the first round once and in WTA singles qualifying four times (incl. Roland Garros, Wimbledon, US Open).

2015: Grand Slam and top 100 debut
She reached the quarterfinals at the WTA Tour twice in Florianópolis, Brazil and in Kockelscheuer, Luxembourg. She reached the second round once; fell in the first round four times (incl. Wimbledon and US Open) and in qualifying five times (incl. the other two majors).

She won three WTA doubles titles and also won one singles and one doubles title on ITF Circuit.

In Wimbledon, she reached her first Grand Slam main draw after exiting ten times in the qualification rounds.

Siegemund reached the top 100 in the WTA rankings on 14 September finishing the season at No. 90 on 9 November 2015.

2016: Breakthrough, first WTA singles title & top 30, US Open mixed-doubles title

At the Australian Open, Siegemund scored one of her biggest victories, defeating former world No. 1 Jelena Janković in the second round in three sets.

In April, she made an upset by reaching the final as a qualifier in Stuttgart, losing to compatriot and defending champion Angelique Kerber. On her way to this success she beat three top-10 players in a row (Simona Halep, Roberta Vinci and Agnieszka Radwańska), all of them in straight sets.

At the Premier Mandatory Madrid Open, she reached as a qualifier the third round. After beating ninth-seed Svetlana Kuznetsova and Mirjana Lučić-Baroni, she lost to Sorana Cîrstea.

At the French Open and in Wimbledon, she was knocked out in the first round.

In July, she won the first WTA title of her career in Båstad, the place where she played her first match on the WTA Tour in 2010. In the final, she defeated Kateřina Siniaková in straight sets.

She got to the quarterfinals at the Olympic Games in Rio de Janeiro.

In September, she won her first Grand Slam title, winning the US Open mixed-doubles championship with Mate Pavić.

2017: First Premier title and injury

After winning only one of nine matches on hardcourt, Siegemund started the clay-court season by reaching the semifinals of the Charleston Open.

She won her second career title in her hometown Premier event Stuttgart Open after a wildcard entry, defeating Kristina Mladenovic in the final, in three sets.

In May at the Nuremberg Cup, she suffered a knee injury which kept her out for the rest of the season.

2018: Return to the tour
Siegemund made her return to the WTA Tour in April at the Charleston Open where she lost in the second round to tenth seed Naomi Osaka. At the Ladies Open Lugano, she retired during her first-round match against Kathinka von Deichmann. Siegemund received a wildcard to compete at the Porsche Tennis Grand Prix as the defending champion. In the first round, she beat Barbora Strýcová but was defeated in round two by eventual finalist CoCo Vandeweghe.

2019: Wimbledon quarterfinal in mixed doubles

Siegemund started her 2019 season at the Aukland Open. She lost in the final round of qualifying to Bianca Andreescu who would end up reaching the final. However, she earned a lucky loser spot into the main draw. She was defeated in the first round by top seed and two-time finalist, Caroline Wozniacki. Getting past qualifying at the Hobart International, she was eliminated in the first round by Dayana Yastremska. At the Australian Open, she beat two-time champion and former world No. 1, Victoria Azarenka, in the first round. She was beaten in the second round by 28th seed Hsieh Su-wei.

2020: French Open quarterfinal, US Open doubles title
Siegemund started the 2020 season at the Auckland Open. She reached the quarterfinals where she lost to top seed and eventual champion, Serena Williams. At the Australian Open, she was defeated in the second round by second seed Karolína Plíšková.

Playing for Germany in the Fed Cup tie against Brazil, Siegemund won both of her rubbers beating Teliana Pereira and Gabriela Cé. Those wins helped Germany win the tie 4–0 to advance to the Fed Cup Finals. Coming through qualifying at the Qatar Open, she made it to the second round where she lost to top seed Ashleigh Barty. Seeded fifth at the Indian Wells Challenger, she reached the quarterfinals and lost to Vera Zvonareva. The WTA Tour was suspended from the week of March 9 through July due to the coronavirus pandemic.

Siegemund returned to action in August at the Palermo Ladies Open where she was eliminated in the second round by fourth seed and eventual finalist, Anett Kontaveit. Competing at the Prague Open, she was beaten in the second round by Sara Sorribes Tormo. Playing one tournament before the US Open, the Cincinnati Open, Siegemund got through qualifying and reached the second round where she lost to fellow qualifier Vera Zvonareva. At the US Open, Siegemund lost in the first round to 16th seed Elise Mertens. However, in doubles, she and Zvonareva won the title beating Nicole Melichar/Xu Yifan in the final.

Siegemund had a great run at the French Open. She reached her first Grand Slam quarterfinals in singles in which she lost to seventh seed Petra Kvitová.

Siegemund ended the year ranked 50 in singles and 41 in doubles.

2021: Top 30 in doubles and Olympics

Siegemund started the 2021 season at the first edition of the Abu Dhabi Open. She lost in the first round to Kirsten Flipkens. Seeded 16th at the first edition of the Gippsland Trophy, she reached the third round where she was defeated by top seed Simona Halep. At the Australian Open, Siegemund was eliminated from the tournament in the first round by tenth seed and seven-time champion, Serena Williams. After the Australian Open, she competed at the Adelaide International. She was beaten in the first round by seventh seed Yulia Putintseva.

Getting past qualifying at the Qatar Open, Siegemund made it to the second round where she lost to eighth seed and two-time champion, Victoria Azarenka. In Dubai, she was defeated in the first round by Anastasia Potapova. At the Miami Open, she withdrew from her second-round match against 14th seed and three-time champion, Victoria Azarenka, due to a right knee injury.

Starting her clay-court season at the Stuttgart Open, Siegemund was eliminated in the second round by top seed and eventual champion, Ashleigh Barty. Getting past qualifying in Madrid, she was beaten in her second-round match by 14th seed Iga Świątek. At the Italian Open, she fell in the final round of qualifying to Ajla Tomljanović. However, due to Venus Williams withdrawing from the event, she entered the main draw as a lucky loser. She lost in the first round to Nadia Podoroska in three sets. Last year quarterfinalist at the French Open, she wasn't able to match that result this year; she lost in the first round to Caroline Garcia.

Seeded eighth at the first edition of the Bad Homburg Open, Siegemund's first grass-court tournament of the season, she reached the quarterfinals where she was defeated by eventual finalist Kateřina Siniaková. At Wimbledon, she was eliminated in the first round by 32nd seed Ekaterina Alexandrova.

Representing Germany at the Summer Olympics, Siegemund fell in the first round to fourth seed and eventual bronze medalist, Elina Svitolina.

Siegemund then withdrew from the US Open due to a knee injury.

2022: First WTA 1000 title & career-high ranking in doubles
Siegemund won her first WTA 1000 doubles title at the Miami Open, again with partner Vera Zvonareva. At the end of the season, she reached a new career-high doubles ranking of world No. 27 on 17 October 2022.

2023: Tenth doubles title
At the United Cup she lost both her singles matches against Petra Kvitova and Jessica Pegula. One week later, she won her tenth title on the WTA Tour at the Hobart International alongside Kirsten Flipkens, which whom she also won the Transylvania Open in October 2022.

She entered the singles competition of the Australian Open using protected ranking. After winning her second round match against Irina-Camelia Begu, Siegemund lost to Caroline Garcia in a three set match lasting over two hours.

Career statistics

Grand Slam performance timelines

Singles

Doubles

Mixed doubles

Grand Slam finals

Women's doubles: 1 (1 title)

Mixed doubles: 1 (1 title)

References

External links

 
 
 
 

1988 births
Living people
Sportspeople from Stuttgart
People from Filderstadt
Sportspeople from Stuttgart (region)
German expatriates in Saudi Arabia
German expatriates in Indonesia
German female tennis players
Olympic tennis players of Germany
Tennis players at the 2016 Summer Olympics
Grand Slam (tennis) champions in mixed doubles
US Open (tennis) champions
Tennis players at the 2020 Summer Olympics
Tennis people from Baden-Württemberg
20th-century German women
21st-century German women